In mathematics, a real or complex-valued function f on d-dimensional Euclidean space satisfies a Hölder condition, or is Hölder continuous, when there are real constants C ≥ 0, α > 0, such that

 

for all x and y in the domain of f.  More generally, the condition can be formulated for functions between any two metric spaces. The number α is called the exponent of the Hölder condition.  A function on an interval satisfying the condition with α > 1 is constant. If α = 1, then the function satisfies a Lipschitz condition. For any α > 0, the condition implies the function is uniformly continuous. The condition is named after Otto Hölder.

We have the following chain of strict inclusions for functions over a closed and bounded non-trivial interval of the real line:

 Continuously differentiable ⊂ Lipschitz continuous ⊂ α-Hölder continuous ⊂  uniformly continuous ⊂ continuous,

where 0 < α ≤ 1.

Hölder spaces
Hölder spaces consisting of functions satisfying a Hölder condition are basic in areas of functional analysis relevant to solving partial differential equations, and in dynamical systems. The Hölder space Ck,α(Ω), where Ω is an open subset of some Euclidean space and k ≥ 0 an integer, consists of those functions on Ω having continuous derivatives up through order k and such that the kth partial derivatives are Hölder continuous with exponent α, where 0 < α ≤ 1. This is a locally convex topological vector space. If the Hölder coefficient

is finite, then the function f is said to be (uniformly) Hölder continuous with exponent α in Ω. In this case, the Hölder coefficient serves as a seminorm. If the Hölder coefficient is merely bounded on compact subsets of Ω, then the function f is said to be locally Hölder continuous with exponent α in Ω.

If the function f and its derivatives up to order k are bounded on the closure of Ω, then the Hölder space  can be assigned the norm

where β ranges over multi-indices and

If Ω is open and bounded, then  is a Banach space with respect to the norm .

Compact embedding of Hölder spaces
Let Ω be a bounded subset of some Euclidean space (or more generally, any totally bounded metric space) and let 0 < α < β ≤ 1 two Hölder exponents. Then, there is an obvious inclusion map of the corresponding Hölder spaces:

which is continuous since, by definition of the Hölder norms, we have:

Moreover, this inclusion is compact, meaning that bounded sets in the ‖ · ‖0,β norm are relatively compact in the ‖ · ‖0,α norm. This is a direct consequence of the Ascoli-Arzelà theorem. Indeed, let (un) be a bounded sequence in C0,β(Ω). Thanks to the Ascoli-Arzelà theorem we can assume without loss of generality that un → u uniformly, and we can also assume u = 0. Then

because

Examples
 If 0 < α ≤ β ≤ 1 then all  Hölder continuous functions on a bounded set Ω are also  Hölder continuous. This also includes β = 1 and therefore all Lipschitz continuous functions on a bounded set are also C0,α Hölder continuous.
 The function f(x) = xβ (with β ≤ 1) defined on [0, 1] serves as a prototypical example of a function that is C0,α Hölder continuous for 0 < α ≤ β, but not for α > β.
 If a function  is –Hölder continuous on an interval and  then  is constant.
 There are examples of uniformly continuous functions that are not α–Hölder continuous for any α. For instance, the function defined on [0, 1/2] by f(0) = 0 and by f(x) = 1/log(x) otherwise is continuous, and therefore uniformly continuous by the Heine-Cantor theorem.  It does not satisfy a Hölder condition of any order, however.
The Weierstrass function defined by:
 

 The Cantor function is Hölder continuous for any exponent  and for no larger one. In the former case, the inequality of the definition holds with the constant C := 2.
 Peano curves from [0, 1] onto the square [0, 1]2 can be constructed to be 1/2–Hölder continuous. It can be proved that when  the image of a α–Hölder continuous function from the unit interval to the square cannot fill the square.
 Sample paths of Brownian motion are almost surely everywhere locally α-Hölder for every 
Functions which are locally integrable and whose integrals satisfy an appropriate growth condition are also Hölder continuous. For example, if we let

and u satisfies

then u is Hölder continuous with exponent α.

Functions whose oscillation decay at a fixed rate with respect to distance are Hölder continuous with an exponent that is determined by the rate of decay. For instance, if

for some function u(x) satisfies

for a fixed λ with 0 < λ < 1 and all sufficiently small values of r, then u is Hölder continuous.

Functions in Sobolev space can be embedded into the appropriate Hölder space via Morrey's inequality if the spatial dimension is less than the exponent of the Sobolev space. To be precise, if  then there exists a constant C, depending only on p and n, such that:

where  Thus if u ∈ W1, p(Rn), then u is in fact Hölder continuous of exponent γ, after possibly being redefined on a set of measure 0.

Properties
A closed additive subgroup of an infinite dimensional Hilbert space H, connected by α–Hölder continuous arcs with α > 1/2, is a linear subspace. There are closed additive subgroups of H, not linear subspaces, connected by 1/2–Hölder continuous arcs. An example is the additive subgroup L2(R, Z) of the Hilbert space L2(R, R).
Any α–Hölder continuous function f on a metric space X admits a Lipschitz approximation by means of a sequence of functions (fk) such that fk is k-Lipschitz and

Conversely, any such sequence (fk) of Lipschitz functions converges to an α–Hölder continuous uniform limit f.

Any α–Hölder function f on a subset X of a normed space E admits a uniformly continuous extension to the whole space, which is Hölder continuous with the same constant C and the same exponent α. The largest such extension is:

The space  is not separable.
The embedding  is not dense.

Notes

References

.
 

Functional analysis
Lipschitz maps
Function spaces